Ringworld: Revenge of the Patriarch is a 1993 video game by Tsunami Games for DOS. It is based on Larry Niven's Ringworld novel series. A sequel, Return to Ringworld, was released in 1994.

Summary
The Patriarch of the Kzinti empire has vowed revenge against the Puppeteer race for their genetic manipulation of the Kzinti. To achieve this, they have created an advanced prototype starship armed with an ancient Slaver weapon capable of destroying planets. The Patriarch first dispatches the ship with the goal of killing the family of the Kzin traitor Speaker-to-Animals, who has taken the name Chmeee. Once done, they will then seek out the home world of the Puppeteers and destroy it. The human Quinn is also travelling to meet with Chmeee to help find Louis Wu who has disappeared. Together, Quinn and Chmeee must travel to Ringworld to find Louis Wu and stop the Kzinti's genocidal plot against the Puppeteers.

Gameplay
Ringworld is a point and click adventure game involving puzzles.

Reception
In 1996, Computer Gaming World declared Ringworld the 14th-worst computer game ever released.

Reviews
Power Play (German magazine) (1993-05) 
Play Time (German magazine) (1993 May)
Joystick (French) (Sep, 1993)
PC Joker (Mar, 1993)
Power Play (Apr, 1993)

References

External links
Ringworld: Revenge of the Patriarch at MobyGames

1993 video games
Adventure games
DOS games
DOS-only games
Known Space stories
Science fiction video games
ScummVM-supported games
Single-player video games
Tsunami Games games
Video games based on novels
Video games developed in the United States